Lijia Zhang (born May 12, 1964 in Nanjing) is a Chinese writer, journalist and public speaker. She describes herself as a communicator between China and the world and has given talks at conferences about contemporary China. She has given lectures at Stanford University, Harvard University, and the University of Sydney.

Early life and education 
As a child, Zhang wanted to become a writer. At the age of 16, she left school and began working in a factory. During the decade at the factory she taught herself English. In 2003, she was able to attend Goldsmiths, University of London, where she earned a master's degree in creative writing.

Career 
Her articles have been published in many newspapers and magazines. She co-authored China Remembers (OUP, 1999) and her memoir "Socialism Is Great!": A Worker's Memoir of the New China, was published by Atlas & Co. and Random House and has been translated into seven languages. During the 2008 Summer Olympics in Beijing, she served as a producer for the BBC crew reporting the games. She was the subject of a BBC TV documentary Peschardt's People. Sponsored by the United States Department of State, she was a fellow on the University of Iowa's International Writing Program in 2009. Her first novel, Lotus, about prostitution set in modern day Shenzhen, was published in 2017.
 
She is a regular guest on ABC, BBC and CNN.

Personal life 
Zhang was married to Calum MacLeod, a British reporter for USA Today. In 2018, she moved from Beijing to London with her two daughters.

References

External links 
 Interview with Lijia Zhang, The Beijinger, March 10, 2008
 Writer and journalist Lijia Zhang, ABC, 5 September 2008 
 Profile at China Speakers Agency

1964 births
Living people
20th-century Chinese women writers
20th-century Chinese writers
20th-century journalists
21st-century Chinese novelists
21st-century Chinese women writers
21st-century journalists
Alumni of Goldsmiths, University of London
Chinese women journalists
Chinese women novelists
International Writing Program alumni
Women memoirists
Writers from Nanjing